Mark Schnitzer is a Professor jointly in the Biology and Applied Physics departments at Stanford University and an Investigator of the Howard Hughes Medical Institute and is a recipient of a Paul Allen grant. His current research focuses on techniques for imaging individual neurons in vivo, including using fluorescent imaging and highly parallel processing techniques. In 2003, he was named to the MIT Technology Review's "TR100" list of young innovators.

References 

Living people
Howard Hughes Medical Investigators
Harvard University alumni
Princeton University alumni
Stanford University Department of Applied Physics faculty
Stanford University Department of Biology faculty
Year of birth missing (living people)
Place of birth missing (living people)
Nationality missing